The Cursed Palace also known as The Accursed Castle (Egyptian Arabic: القصر الملعون translit: Al Qasr Al Mal’oun) is 1962 Egyptian horror film starring Salah Zulfikar, Mariam Fakhr Eddine and directed by Hassan Reda.

Synopsis 
Fahmy, a rich and paralyzed man, asked the young lawyer, Hassan, to make his will for him. When Hassan returned to present the will to Fahmy and found that he had changed his mind due to the appearance of some signs of madness on his daughter, who was constantly saying that she had seen someone kill her father in the dark, Hassan, with the help of his colleague Fathi, tried to find the secret key. He was suspected of Negeya and the palace servant's marina. The ghosts and strange sounds in the night made the atmosphere very tense, and after several incidents things gradually became clear. Fahmy's twin brother was recently released from prison, so he replaced his brother after he imprisoned him in a secret hall at the bottom of the palace to kill him in time. The criminal brother's plan fails at the last moment thanks to the vigilance of Hassan and his colleague, and the doors of happiness open before Hassan and Yousriya.

Main cast 

 Salah Zulfikar as Hassan
 Mariam Fakhr Eddine as Yousriya
 Mahmoud El-Meliguy as Fahmy
 Alwiya Gamil as Nageya
 Abdel Moneim Ibrahim as Fathi
 Thoraya Fakhry as Hassan’s mother
 Nahed Sabry as the dancer
 Qadria Qadri as Khairia

References

External links 

 
 The Cursed Palace in elCinema

1962 films
1960s Arabic-language films
Egyptian horror films
Films shot in Egypt
1962 horror films